Bala Deshpande is the Senior Managing Director of the venture capital  firm, New Enterprise Associates  (India)  since 2008. NEA is a venture capital firm with over US$13 billion in committed capital. NEA started direct investments in India during the downturn in 2008 and has since built a portfolio of 14 companies.

According to Fortune India (2016), she is the 49th most powerful women in India.

Education and personal life
She has completed her post-graduation in Economics  from the University of Mumbai. She also holds a master's degree in Management  Studies from the Jamnalal Bajaj Institute of Management Studies.

She is married to Chaitanya Deshpande, who heads the Investor Relations and M&A functions at Marico Limited. The couple lives in Mumbai.

Career
She has over 23 years of professional experience, including 14 years  of private equity experience. Her private equity experience has seen the full cycle from nurturing young companies to executing multiple exits, including IPO's, buybacks, strategic sales, and capital market divestments. Under her leadership, NEA India's assets under management (AUM)  have grown from ~$100mn to over ~$350mn. Bala's investment expertise includes sectors such as retail, media, IT&ITES, telecom, construction  as also some manufacturing  related industries.

Prior to joining the board of NEA (India), Bala was the Director of Investments at ICICI  Ventures since 2000.  At ICICI Venture, she used her operational experience to identify opportunities for investment and to play a strategic role in shaping the future of investee companies. She led teams in deals ranging from Rs 6 crore to Rs 300 crore at ICICI Venture. She launched leading e-commerce ventures like Traveljini and BillJunction. Further, she was involved in executing over 10 exits during her tenure with ICICI Ventures.

Before ICICI Ventures, Bala had multi industry exposure and has worked across diverse functions such as sales, distribution and brand management with MNCs such as Bestfoods, Cadbury  and ICI. At Bestfoods, she was also part of the strategic planning team.

Recognition
Bala has been nominated among India's top 50 most powerful women in business by Forbes consecutively in 2011, and 2012. She was also nominated for the Women Leadership Forum held at Bestfoods, New York.

Directorship
Bala is associated with several leading organization in the capacity of a Director. She is currently on the board of:

 Air Works India Engineering Private Ltd
 Naaptol Online Shopping Pvt Ltd 
 Financial Software & Systems Private Ltd.
 IndiaHomes
 inTarvo Technologies Ltd. 
 VISHWA Infrastructures & Services Pvt. Ltd 
 Future Retail Limited (formerly, Pantaloon Retail (India) Ltd)
 Nova Medical Centers Private Ltd
 Naukri Internet Services Pvt. Ltd
 Info Edge (India) Ltd

References

External links
 Bala Deshpande

Living people
Indian women chief executives
Indian chief executives
Year of birth missing (living people)
University of Mumbai alumni